Koshekhabl (Kośheble) is a rural locality (an aul) and the administrative center of Koshekhablsky District of the Republic of Adygea, Russia, located on the Bolshaya Laba River (Kuban's tributary), some  northeast of Maykop. Population: 

The name "Koshekhabl" is derived from the Circassian words "Kosho" (a Shapsug family name) and "Habl" (meaning neighborhood).

A branch of the Adyghe State University operates in Koshekhabl.

References

Rural localities in Koshekhablsky District